Extras or The Extras may refer to:

 Extra (acting)
 Extras (TV series), a British sitcom
 Extras (film), a 2001 Chinese documentary
 Extras (novel), by Scott Westerfeld
 Extras (album), a compilation album by the Jam
 Extras (The Mango People), a 2011 Pakistani sitcom drama serial
 Extras (cricket), runs scored not attributed to a particular batsman
 Al-Kompars, a 1993 Syrian film titled The Extras in international markets

See also
 Extra innings
 Extra (disambiguation)